Kazyonnaya Zaimka is a rural locality (a settlement) in Barnaul, Altai Krai, Russia. The population was 2,769 as of 2013. There are 55 streets.

Geography 
Kazyonnaya Zaimka is located 16 km northwest of Barnaul by road. Gonba is the nearest rural locality.

References 

Rural localities in Barnaul urban okrug